Fastov is a rural locality (a khutor) and the administrative center of Fastovskoye Rural Settlement, Ilovlinsky District, Volgograd Oblast, Russia. The population was 132 as of 2010. There are 9 streets.

Geography 
Fastov is located in steppe, on the right bank of the Talovaya River, on the Volga Upland, 41 km southeast of Ilovlya (the district's administrative centre) by road. Kotluban is the nearest rural locality.

References 

Rural localities in Ilovlinsky District